Palazzo Rossotti-Chiarelli, dating back to the 18th century, is located in via Rossotti in Alcamo, in the  province of Trapani.  It is in via Rossotti: in the same street you can also visit the Chiesa del Santissimo Salvatore(o Badia Grande).

Description 
The façade, in baroque style, has five windows and seven secondary entrances on the ground floor,  that are part of some houses, and the main one  which is very fine.
On the first floor, apart three windows with brackets and  a stone fronton,  there are five balconies with brackets and galleries made with carved stone.

The main balconies are very imposing, with galleries realized with carved stone, and an iron convex railing; the doors of the balconies look very elegant too, with flowery elements,  Corinthian capitals surmounted by an architrave and by the family's coat of arms, represented by a shield with undulating lines, overcome by a crowned lion rampant, turning towards the rising sun.
There are some doors and windows in via Tenente De Blasi Chiarelli and via Madonna dell'Alto.

Until the end of the 20th century, this palace has been the Rossotti's residence, then it was inherited by the Chiarelli family. Today it belongs to the families Settipani and Amato.

See also 
 Casa De Ballis
 Palazzo Pastore (Alcamo)
 Villa Luisa (Alcamo)

References

Sources 
 Roberto Calia: I Palazzi dell'aristocrazia e della borghesia alcamese; Alcamo, Carrubba, 1997
 P.M. Rocca: di alcuni antichi edifici di Alcamo; Palermo, tip. Castellana-Di Stefano, 1905
 Giuseppe Polizzi: I monumenti di antichità e d'arte della provincia di Trapani; Trapani, Giovanni Modica Romano, 1879

External links 
 cenni_storici
 palazzo-rossottichiarelli-sicily-italy

Buildings and structures in Alcamo
Buildings and structures completed in the 18th century
18th-century establishments in Italy
18th-century architecture in Italy